Mannington Township is a township in Salem County, in the U.S. state of New Jersey. As of the 2020 United States census, the township's population was 1,475, a decrease of 331 (−18.3%) from the 2010 census count of 1,806, which in turn reflected an increase of 247 (+15.8%) from the 1,559 counted in the 2000 census.

History 

Mannington Township was first mentioned on May 12, 1701. It had been previously known as East Fenwick Township, which was mentioned on September 3, 1679, though the details of its incorporation are unknown. The township was incorporated by New Jersey Legislature's Township Act of 1798 on February 21, 1798 as one of New Jersey's original group of 104 townships. A portion of the township was taken in 1878 and annexed by Quinton Township. The township's name derives from the Lenape deity, variously spelled as Maneto or Manito.

As a dry town, the sale of alcohol is not legally permitted.

Among the oldest buildings are Barrett's Plantation House and the Salem County Insane Asylum.

Geography
According to the United States Census Bureau, the township had a total area of 37.90 square miles (98.17 km2), including 33.88 square miles (87.76 km2) of land and 4.02 square miles (10.41 km2) of water (10.61%).

The Salem River flows along the township's northern and western boundaries.

The township borders the Salem County municipalities of Alloway Township, Carneys Point Township, Pennsville Township, Pilesgrove Township, Quinton Township and Salem.

Unincorporated communities, localities and place names located partially or completely within the township include Acton, Claysville, Halltown, Marshalltown, Pointers, Portertown, Slapes Corner, Welchtown and Welchville.

Demographics

2010 census

The Census Bureau's 2006–2010 American Community Survey showed that (in 2010 inflation-adjusted dollars) median household income was $63,650 (with a margin of error of +/− $5,287) and the median family income was $75,625 (+/− $17,613). Males had a median income of $59,896 (+/− $6,020) versus $42,159 (+/− $10,096) for females. The per capita income for the borough was $33,369 (+/− $5,096). About 6.1% of families and 6.7% of the population were below the poverty line, including 10.2% of those under age 18 and 8.2% of those age 65 or over.

2000 census
As of the 2000 United States census there were 1,559 people, 539 households, and 409 families residing in the township. There were 573 housing units at an average density of 16.5 per square mile (6.4/km2). The racial makeup of the township was 75.63% White, 20.91% African American, 0.51% Native American, 0.38% Asian, 1.73% from other races, and 0.83% from two or more races. Hispanic or Latino of any race were 3.34% of the population.

There were 539 households, out of which 26.5% had children under the age of 18 living with them, 60.9% were married couples living together, 10.4% had a female householder with no husband present, and 24.1% were non-families. 20.6% of all households were made up of individuals, and 10.0% had someone living alone who was 65 years of age or older.  The average household size was 2.63 and the average family size was 3.02.

In the township the population was spread out, with 22.6% under the age of 18, 4.8% from 18 to 24, 25.5% from 25 to 44, 23.7% from 45 to 64, and 23.4% who were 65 years of age or older.  The median age was 43 years. For every 100 females, there were 95.9 males.  For every 100 females age 18 and over, there were 88.6 males.

The median income for a household in the township was $52,625, and the median income for a family was $62,500. Males had a median income of $45,714 versus $29,727 for females. The per capita income for the township was $24,262.  About 3.8% of families and 6.9% of the population were below the poverty line, including 11.5% of those under age 18 and 8.1% of those age 65 or over.

Economy
In 2010, the company undertook an extensive cleanup of contaminated soil on the plant site.

Government

Local government
Mannington Township is governed under the Township form of New Jersey municipal government, one of 141 municipalities (of the 564) statewide that use this form, the second-most commonly used form of government in the state. The governing body is a three-member Township Committee, whose members are elected directly by the voters at-large in partisan elections to serve three-year terms of office on a staggered basis, with one seat coming up for election each year as part of the November general election in a three-year cycle. At an annual reorganization meeting conducted during the first week of January, the Township Committee selects one of its members to serve as Mayor and another as Deputy Mayor.

, members of the Mannington Township Committee are Mayor Donald C. Asay (R, term on committee and as mayor ends December 31, 2022), Deputy Mayor Luke S. Patrick Jr. (R, term on committee ends 2024; term as deputy mayor ends 2022) and Kenneth H. Dunham Jr. (R, 2024).

In the 2012 general election, the Township Committee had Democrats in the majority for the first time in township history, though the committee decided to choose the committee's only Republican, Donald C. Asay, as mayor.

Federal, state and county representation 
Mannington Township is located in the 2nd Congressional District and is part of New Jersey's 3rd state legislative district.

 

Salem County is governed by a five-member Board of County Commissioners who are elected at-large to serve three-year terms of office on a staggered basis, with either one or two seats coming up for election each year. At an annual reorganization meeting held in the beginning of January, the board selects a Director and a Deputy Director from among its members. , Salem County's Commissioners (with party, residence and term-end year listed in parentheses) are 
Director Benjamin H. Laury (R, Elmer, term as commissioner ends December 31, 2024; term as director ends 2022), 
Deputy Director Gordon J. "Mickey" Ostrum, Jr. (R, Pilesgrove Township, term as commissioner ends 2024; term as deputy director ends 2022),  
R. Scott Griscom (R, Mannington Township, 2022), 
Edward A. Ramsay (R, Pittsgrove Township, 2023) and
Lee R. Ware (D, Elsinboro Township, 2022). Constitutional officers elected on a countywide basis are 
County Clerk Dale A. Cross (R, 2024),
Sheriff Charles M. Miller (R, 2024) and 
Surrogate Nicki A. Burke (D, 2023).

Politics
As of March 2011, there were a total of 1,014 registered voters in Mannington Township, of which 243 (24.0% vs. 30.6% countywide) were registered as Democrats, 285 (28.1% vs. 21.0%) were registered as Republicans and 486 (47.9% vs. 48.4%) were registered as Unaffiliated. There were no voters registered to other parties. Among the township's 2010 Census population, 56.1% (vs. 64.6% in Salem County) were registered to vote, including 68.7% of those ages 18 and over (vs. 84.4% countywide).

In the 2012 presidential election, Republican Mitt Romney received 55.8% of the vote (406 cast), ahead of Democrat Barack Obama with 42.1% (306 votes), and other candidates with 2.1% (15 votes), among the 734 ballots cast by the township's 1,036 registered voters (7 ballots were spoiled), for a turnout of 70.8%. In the 2008 presidential election, Republican John McCain received 394 votes (52.0% vs. 46.6% countywide), ahead of Democrat Barack Obama with 349 votes (46.0% vs. 50.4%) and other candidates with 10 votes (1.3% vs. 1.6%), among the 758 ballots cast by the township's 1,018 registered voters, for a turnout of 74.5% (vs. 71.8% in Salem County). In the 2004 presidential election, Republican George W. Bush received 414 votes (55.3% vs. 52.5% countywide), ahead of Democrat John Kerry with 324 votes (43.3% vs. 45.9%) and other candidates with 5 votes (0.7% vs. 1.0%), among the 748 ballots cast by the township's 1,021 registered voters, for a turnout of 73.3% (vs. 71.0% in the whole county).

In the 2013 gubernatorial election, Republican Chris Christie received 73.8% of the vote (363 cast), ahead of Democrat Barbara Buono with 24.6% (121 votes), and other candidates with 1.6% (8 votes), among the 497 ballots cast by the township's 999 registered voters (5 ballots were spoiled), for a turnout of 49.7%. In the 2009 gubernatorial election, Republican Chris Christie received 268 votes (46.7% vs. 46.1% countywide), ahead of Democrat Jon Corzine with 225 votes (39.2% vs. 39.9%), Independent Chris Daggett with 63 votes (11.0% vs. 9.7%) and other candidates with 11 votes (1.9% vs. 2.0%), among the 574 ballots cast by the township's 1,010 registered voters, yielding a 56.8% turnout (vs. 47.3% in the county).

Education
The Mannington Township School District serves public school students in pre-kindergarten through eighth grade at Mannington Township School. As of the 2018–19 school year, the district, comprised of one school, had an enrollment of 156 students and 17.6 classroom teachers (on an FTE basis), for a student–teacher ratio of 8.9:1. In the 2016–17 school year, Mannington had the 31st smallest enrollment of any school district in the state, with 158 students.

Public school students in ninth through twelfth grades attend Salem High School in Salem City, together with students from Elsinboro Township, Lower Alloways Creek Township and Quinton Township, as part of a sending/receiving relationship with the Salem City School District. As of the 2018–19 school year, the high school had an enrollment of 374 students and 44.0 classroom teachers (on an FTE basis), for a student–teacher ratio of 8.5:1.

Infrastructure

Transportation

Roads and highways

New Jersey Route 45 (Salem-Woodstown Road) is the main highway serving Mannington Township. County Route 540 (Pointers Auburn Road) also traverses the township. Their convergence with Pointers Sharptown Road (County Route 620) is named Pointers, or the Pointers, which "pointed" toward Salem.

Public transportation
NJ Transit provides bus service between Salem and Philadelphia on the 401, with local service between Penns Grove and Woodstown offered on the 468 route.

Freight rail
Once also providing passenger service, the  southern portion of the freight rail Salem Branch operated under contract by Southern Railroad of New Jersey runs through Mannington, with Mannington Mills being one of the short line's major customers.

Health care
Salem Medical Center is a 126-bed hospital that was founded in 1919 and moved to Mannington Township in 1951. In 2017, New Jersey approved a plan to sell it to Prime Healthcare Foundation for $15 million.

Notable people

People who were born in, residents of, or otherwise closely associated with Mannington Township include:

 Collins B. Allen (1866–1953), President of the New Jersey Senate
 Robert Gibbon Johnson (1771–1850), gentleman farmer best known for the apocryphal story that he publicly ate a basket of tomatoes at the Old Salem County Courthouse in 1820 to demonstrate that they were not poisonous
 Bethanne McCarthy Patrick (born 1970), member of the New Jersey General Assembly since 2022 from the 3rd Legislative District
 Thomas A. Pankok (1931–2022), politician who served in the New Jersey General Assembly from 1982 to 1986, where he represented the 3rd Legislative District

References

External links

Mannington Township official website
Mannington Township School

School Data for the Mannington Township School, National Center for Education Statistics

 
1701 establishments in New Jersey
Populated places established in 1701
Township form of New Jersey government
Townships in Salem County, New Jersey